The following lists events that happened during 1973 in New Zealand.

Population
 Estimated population as of 31 December 1973 – 3,024,900
 Increase since 31 December 1972 – 65,200 (2.20%)
 Males per 100 females – 99.7
 It took 21 years for the population to grow from 2 million to 3 million.

Incumbents

Regal and viceregal
Head of State – Elizabeth II
Governor-General – Denis Blundell

Government
The 37th New Zealand Parliament commences. Government is by a Labour majority of 55 seats to the National Party's 32 seats.

Speaker of the House – Stan Whitehead
Prime Minister – Norman Kirk
Deputy Prime Minister – Hugh Watt
Minister of Finance – Bill Rowling
Minister of Foreign Affairs – Norman Kirk
Attorney-General – Martyn Finlay

Parliamentary opposition
 Leader of the Opposition – Jack Marshall (National)

Judiciary
Chief Justice — Richard Wild

Main centre leaders
Mayor of Auckland – Dove-Myer Robinson
Mayor of Hamilton – Mike Minogue
Mayor of Wellington – Frank Kitts
Mayor of Christchurch – Neville Pickering
Mayor of Dunedin – Jim Barnes

Events
 1 January – The 1973 New Year Honours are announced
 4 February – The details of the Trans-Tasman Travel Arrangement are announced
 7 February – A heat wave affects large parts of New Zealand. Rangiora reaches , the highest temperature recorded in New Zealand.
 11 February – The Rolling Stones play a single New Zealand concert, at Western Springs Stadium, Auckland, on their 1973 Pacific Tour
 1 March – The Trans-Tasman Travel Arrangement is implemented
 10 April – Prime Minister Kirk cancels the 1973 South African rugby tour to New Zealand over fears of civil unrest.
 16 April – After a retrial, Arthur Allan Thomas is again found guilty of the murders of Harvey and Jeannette Crewe.
 2 June – The 1973 Queen's Birthday Honours are announced
 19 October – The New Zealand Day Act 1973, making 6 February a national holiday, receives royal assent.
 31 October – Colour television is introduced.

Arts and literature
Graham Billing wins the Robert Burns Fellowship.

See 1973 in art, 1973 in literature

Music

New Zealand Music Awards
ALBUM OF THE YEAR  John Donoghue – Spirit Of Pelorus Jack
RECORDING ARTIST / GROUP OF THE YEAR  Shona Laing
BEST SINGLE / SINGLE OF THE YEAR  John Hanlon – Damn The Dam
BEST NEW ARTIST  Shona Laing
BEST NZ RECORDED COMPOSITION  Anna Leah – Love Bug
PRODUCER OF THE YEAR  Keith Southern – Join Together
ENGINEER OF THE YEAR  Peter Hitchcock – Only Time Could Let Us Know
ARRANGER OF THE YEAR  Mike Harvey – Damn The Dam

See: 1973 in music

Performing arts

 Benny Award presented by the Variety Artists Club of New Zealand to Ray Columbus.

Radio and television
Colour television broadcasts begin at 7:45pm on 31 October. The licence fee for a colour television is NZ$35.
In December, Fred Dagg makes his first appearance.
Feltex Television Awards:
Natural History Programme: Bird of a Single Flight
Best News, Current Affairs: Election Night '72
Best Light Entertainment: Loxene Golden Disc 1972
Best Drama and the Arts: Gone Up North and An Awful Silence
Best Documentary: Deciding
Allied Crafts: Loxene Golden Disc set and work on Pop Co.
The first ZM radio stations were started in 1973 as 1ZM Auckland, 2ZM Wellington and 3ZM Christchurch.

See: 1973 in New Zealand television, 1973 in television, List of TVNZ television programming, :Category:Television in New Zealand, :Category:New Zealand television shows, Public broadcasting in New Zealand

Film
Rangi's Catch

See: :Category:1973 film awards, 1973 in film, List of New Zealand feature films, Cinema of New Zealand, :Category:1973 films

Sport

Athletics
 Terry Manners wins his first national title in the men's marathon, clocking 2:18:28.7 on 10 March in Inglewood. In the same year, on 1 December, the title is taken over by John Robinson who wins his first national title, clocking 2:15:03.6 in Christchurch.

Chess
 The 80th National Chess Championship is held in Wellington, and is won by Ortvin Sarapu of Auckland (his 12th title).

Horse racing
From January 1973, all races are run at metric distances rather than imperial.

Harness racing
 New Zealand Trotting Cup – Arapaho
 Auckland Trotting Cup – Arapaho

Soccer
 New Zealand National Soccer League is won by Christchurch United
 The Chatham Cup is won by Mount Wellington who beat North Shore United 3–0 in the final
 New Zealand hosts and wins the inaugural Oceania Cup tournament, beating Tahiti 2–0 in the final

Births

 25 January: Ruben Wiki, rugby league footballer
 20 February: Leisen Jobe, field hockey player
 1 April: Stephen Fleming, cricketer
 8 April: Nicholas Tongue, freestyle swimmer
 27 May:
 Tana Umaga, rugby player
 Ian Winchester, athlete
 16 June: Shane Reed, athlete (died 2022)
 2 July: Andrew Buckley, field hockey player
 10 July: Andrew McCormick, rugby union footballer
 23 July: Adrian Cashmore, rugby player
 31 July: Tasha Williams, hammer thrower
 4 August: Hymie Gill, field hockey player
 5 August: Justin Marshall, rugby player
 13 August: Martin Moana, rugby league footballer
 19 August: Carl Bulfin, cricketer
 23 August: Kerry Walmsley, cricketer
 5 September: Lesley Nicol, netball player
 1 September: Trent Bray, freestyle swimmer
 14 November: Darren Smith, field hockey player
 15 November: Shayne O'Connor, cricketer
 16 November: Brendan Laney, rugby player
 29 December: Garth da Silva, boxer
 Kirsten Cameron, swimmer

Deaths

 5 February – John Stewart, politician (born 1902)
 11 April – Rongowhakaata Pere Halbert, Māori leader, interpreter, historian, genealogist (born 1894)
 20 May – Charles Brasch, poet and literary editor (born 1909)
 18 November – Peter McKeefry, Roman Catholic bishop and cardinal (born 1899)
 19 November – Cyril Allcott, cricketer (born 1896)
 15 December – Keith Buttle, mayor of Auckland (born 1900)

Full date unknown
Edith Louisa Niederer, farmer and community leader (born 1890)

References

See also
List of years in New Zealand
Timeline of New Zealand history
History of New Zealand
Military history of New Zealand
Timeline of the New Zealand environment
Timeline of New Zealand's links with Antarctica

For world events and topics in 1973 not specifically related to New Zealand see: 1973

 
New Zealand
Years of the 20th century in New Zealand